ISPE may refer to:

 International Society for Pharmacoepidemiology
 Instituto Superior Parque de España